Hokusei may refer to:

 Hokusei, Mie, a former town in Inabe District, Mie Prefecture, Japan, now part of the city of Inabe
 Hokusei Station
 Northwest (disambiguation)